Darius Gerard L. Semaña (born June 30, 1973) is a Filipino lead guitarist for the band Parokya ni Edgar and is the oldest member of the group.

Biography
Semaña grew up in Mataasnakahoy, Batangas and attended Fine Arts in the University of the Philippines Diliman in Quezon City. He, along with Vinci Montaner, are the only members of Parokya ni Edgar who have earned a bachelor's degree. It is also publicly known that he is one of two band members who did not attend Ateneo de Manila University, the other member being bassist Buwi Meneses who is lesser known as a non-Atenean graduate and is a childhood friend of Chito Miranda instead. Semaña and Meneses were former bandmates before joining Parokya ni Edgar. Semaña is a high school alumnus of Ateneo's rival school, De La Salle (Lipa City, Batangas branch), which serves as material for many of the band's running jokes in their songs.

Semaña is mostly seen playing a Fender Stratocaster. He is a member of the Tau Gamma Phi fraternity in the Philippines along with bandmate Buwi Meneses.

Semaña is married to a make-up artist and they have a son.

Discography

With Parokya ni Edgar
 Khangkhungkherrnitz (1996)
 Buruguduystunstugudunstuy (1997)
 Jingle Balls Silent Night Holy Cow (1998)
 Gulong Itlog Gulong (1999)
 Edgar Edgar Musikahan (2002)
 Bigotilyo (2003)
 Halina Sa Parokya (2005)
 Solid (2007)
 Middle-Aged Juvenile Novelty Pop Rockers (2010)
 Pogi Years Old (2016)
 Borbolen (2021)

References

1973 births
University of the Philippines Diliman alumni
Musicians from Manila
Musicians from Batangas
Filipino guitarists
Lead guitarists
Living people
20th-century guitarists
21st-century guitarists
20th-century Filipino musicians
21st-century Filipino musicians
20th-century male musicians
21st-century male musicians
Filipino rock guitarists